Marcelina Kiala (born 9 November 1979) is a retired Angolan handball player and a former member of the Angola women's national handball team. Kiala competed at the 2000 Summer Olympics and 2012 Summer Olympics, 2005 and 2007 World Women's Handball Championship.

She is the sister of fellow Angolan women's handball player, Luisa Kiala, half-sister of Natália Bernardo and the wife of former Angolan handball coach Vivaldo Eduardo.

References

External links
 

1979 births
Living people
Handball players from Luanda
Olympic handball players of Angola
Handball players at the 2000 Summer Olympics
Angolan female handball players
Handball players at the 2012 Summer Olympics
African Games gold medalists for Angola
African Games medalists in handball
Competitors at the 2011 All-Africa Games